Upper Violet Creek Provincial Park is a provincial park in British Columbia, Canada.

References
BC Parks infopage

Parks in the Shuswap Country
Monashee Mountains
Provincial parks of British Columbia